Jahanara Begum (1614–1681) was a Mughal princess. 

Jahanara Begum may also refer to:
 Jahan Ara Begum Surma (born 1958), Bangladesh Awami League politician
 Jahanara Begum (politician) (1942–2021), Bangladesh Nationalist Party politician
 Jahanara Begum (social worker), Bangladeshi social worker